Raja Mumtaz Hussain Rathore (died 16 June 1999) was the third Prime Minister of Azad Kashmir in Pakistan from 29 June 1990 to 5 July 1991.

Jammu and Kashmir National Student Federation
As a student he founded the Jammu Kashmir National Student Federation and, upon completing his education, became a lawyer. In 1970, he ran for his first election as a candidate for the Muslim Conference, and became an AJK Assembly member for Upper Hevali.

Political career
At the suggestion of Zulfikar Ali Bhutto, he joined Bhutto's Pakistan People's Party (PPP). In 1975 he was elected as a PPP candidate and became the Senior Minister of the Khan Abdhul Hameed Khan PPP-led government. Portfolios held thereafter included Finance, Forests and Revenue Minister. He won five consecutive elections.

Rathore was elected Prime Minister under the fourth Assembly in May 1990 with his tenure officially starting on 29 June. He served as Prime Minister until 1991, when he was ousted and arrested after accusing Nawaz Sharif of rigging the state election. Rathore annulled the results and called for new elections to be held, resulting in the Pakistani government proclaiming his actions illegal and removing him from the office.  His arrest lead to protests in Azad Kashmir and he was released after a few days. His political career continued and, after his tenure as Prime Minister ended, Rathore lead nearly 2,000 constituents in a march to the India-controlled Kashmir in 1993. He was arrested, allegedly along with many other protesters. Afterward, Rathore was elected the Speaker of the Assembly on 30 July 1996.

Death
Raja Hussain Mumtaz Rathore died of heart failure on 16 June 1999 in Hevali. He was buried in the same graveyard as his mother in Pullangi. Each year on 20 May, a memorial is held in his memory, attended by state and national leadership in his hometown. His son Raja Faisal Mumtaz Rathore has also pursued a political career, including a General Secretary position in the PPP.

References

1999 deaths
Jammu and Kashmir politicians
Pahari Pothwari people
Year of birth missing